Shrimp roe noodles or Shrimp noodles are a variety of Chinese noodle popular in Hong Kong and Guangdong. One of the special characteristic that distinguish this noodle from the many other varieties of Chinese noodle is the salty shrimp roe forming tiny black spots on strips of the noodles.

Production
The noodle is made of wheat flour, salt, tapioca flour, monosodium glutamate (MSG), and shrimp roe.  It comes in a palm-sized hard noodle bundle. Mix the shrimp, eggs, flour and other materials, and then put the dough is placed into a mechanical press with holes through which the dough is forced to form strands of noodles.

Preparation
Because this noodle has some taste of its own, the most common method of cooking is directly boiling the noodles. Soy sauce or additional flavorings can still be added.  Depending on the noodle brand, the black dots may disappear after cooking.

Gallery

See also
 Chinese noodles

References

External links
Photo

Chinese noodles
Hong Kong noodle dishes